Oxon Hill High School (OHHS) is a public senior high school, located in Oxon Hill, an unincorporated area in Prince George's County, Maryland, and a suburb of Washington, D.C. in the United States. The school, which serves grades 9 through 12, is a part of the Prince George's County Public Schools system.

Oxon Hill is one of three schools in Prince George's county to offer the Science & Technology Program (see below), a magnet program with a highly selective admissions process.  This program is a "school within a school" with approximately 125 students in each entering class. Overall, the school has approximately 1,500 students spread across the four grade levels.  In recent years, the school has suffered persistent overcrowding due to its popular academic programs, extracurricular activities, and location in the burgeoning southern tier of the county.

The school mascot is a Clipper Ship, as chosen through a student contest. The school motto is Navis Semper Naviget (May The Ship Sail Forever).

It serves: portions of the Oxon Hill and Fort Washington census-designated places, as well as all of National Harbor CDP.

History
The Oxon Hill Consolidated School, a union of five elementary schools, started in 1925. The school's first addition came in 1926, with three more in a period between 1928 and 1938 at the site which is currently Oxon Hill Elementary School on Livingston Road.

In 1948, the consolidated school ended and a grades 7 through 12 school was established in a new two-story building, which is currently the Education and Staff Development Center facing Maryland Route 210. The school operated on a split session until John Hanson Junior High School opened. With an expanding suburban population, a larger campus opened in 1959, on Leyte Drive in the Southlawn community. (In the early 1960s the school's zoned attendance area stretched from the District of Columbia line as far south as Piscataway Creek/Bay. In the 1960s/1970s many of these neighborhoods were reassigned to the newly-built Potomac, Crossland, and Friendly high schools). The school's music departments were especially noted, winning awards on local, national, and international levels. The student body was nearly all Caucasian, which gradually changed to majority African American as did the community. In the 1980s, the school was expanded by adding the magnet program's Science and Technology building.

In 1966 Oxon Hill High School, then serving as a senior high school with grades 10, 11, and 12, was selected as one of the first dozen high schools in the United States to participate in the U.S. Air Force Junior Reserve Officer Training Corps (AFJROTC) program.

The school received some attention in the local media in 1995 after the shooting death of student Charles "Chuck" Marsh while waiting for a bus in front of the school. President Clinton alluded to the case when he made his remark about requiring school uniforms in his State of the Union address.

A complete new  school facility was scheduled for completion in 2013. The old building was to be demolished. The capacity of the new building is 1,200 students.

Science and Technology Program
The Science and Technology Program (STP), offered at OHHS since 1982, is a highly structured, four-year academic program. Of twenty-eight possible credits, a student is required to obtain a minimum of thirteen credits in specific mathematics, pre-engineering technology, research and science courses. In grades nine and ten, the program consists of common experiences courses for all student. In grades eleven and twelve, each student must choose course work from at least one of four major study areas. Students are expected to be enrolled in a full schedule of classes during the entire four-year program. External experiences are possible and encouraged, but must be a direct extension or enrichment of the Science and Technology Program, and have the recommendation of the Science and Technology Center Coordinator prior to approval by the principal.

At the end of tenth grade, students choose one major study area: pre-engineering technology, biological sciences, physical sciences, or science and technology exploration (i.e. computer science). The following course requirements correspond with each area of study:

Pre-engineering technology (PET)
- One advanced technology STP course: electronics/energy systems or production/statics systems
- One drafting and design STP course: engineering or architectural drafting and design
- One specific science elective
- Mathematics through pre-calculus
- Research Practicum

Biological science
- One advanced chemistry course: AP Chemistry or Bio-Organic Chemistry
- AP Biology
- One specific science elective
- Mathematics through pre-calculus
- Research Practicum

H.S.L Physical science
- AP Chemistry
- AP Physics
- One specific science elective
- Mathematics through calculus
- Research practicum

Computer science
- Computer mathematics
- AP computer science
- One specific science elective
- Mathematics through pre-calculus
- Research practicum

Scholarship(s)
STP students at Oxon Hill have been recipients of a high number of college and/or military scholarships, grants, and awards since the inception of the program. Scholarship award opportunities for Oxon Hill High School have exceeded twenty-three million dollars ($23,000,000.00) annually. Virtually all STP students enter four-year colleges/universities immediately following graduation.

Science and Technology Program continuance & certification requirements
Students must progress toward, and meet, the STP certification criteria to remain in the program. This includes extra science and technology-centered classes and a year-long research practicum project completed in the students' senior year. Upon graduation, each student who has met the STP certification criteria is awarded the Science and Technology Program Certification of Completion.

Notable alumni 

 O'Brien Alston, NFL linebacker
 Rebekkah Brunson, Women's National Basketball Association player, 5-time WNBA champion
 Lamar Butler, former basketball player for George Mason University
 Derrick Delmore, championship ice skater (World Junior Championships, National Collegiate Championships)
 Derrick Fenner, NFL running back
 Danny Gatton, sometimes called "The World's Greatest Unknown Guitarist"
 Jerome Grant, executive chef of Sweet Home Cafe inside the National Museum of African American History and Culture
 Taraji P. Henson, Oscar-nominated and Golden Globe-winning actress and singer
 Mechelle Lewis, member of US track and field women's 4x100 meter relay team in 2008 Beijing Olympics
 Meshell Ndegeocello, singer, songwriter and musician
 Marty Padgett, journalist and author
 Emily Perez, first female minority Command Sergeant Major in history of United States Military Academy at West Point.  Killed in action, September 12, 2006.
 Lawrence Sidbury, NFL defensive end
 Valerie Solanas, radical feminist known for the SCUM Manifesto, and for her attempt to murder artist Andy Warhol.
 Aaron D. Spears, soap opera actor
 Michael Sweetney, National Basketball Association player
 Kriselda Valderrama, politician who represents district 26 in the Maryland House of Delegates

References

External links
 

Public high schools in Maryland
Educational institutions established in 1925
Magnet schools in Maryland
NCSSS schools
Schools in Prince George's County, Maryland
1925 establishments in Maryland
Oxon Hill, Maryland